Barbara Barbara, We Face a Shining Future (stylised as Barbara Barbara, we face a shining future) is the ninth studio album by British electronic group Underworld, released on 18 March 2016. It is the band's first studio album since Barking in 2010. Barbara Barbara received widespread critical acclaim upon its release and placed in several international charts. The album has also earned a 2017 Grammy Award nomination for Best Dance/Electronic Album.

Background
In September 2010, Underworld released their eighth studio album Barking, a collaboration heavy record that consists of many guest contributors including High Contrast, Paul van Dyk and Dubfire, and features more emphasis on house music and drum and bass. After the release of Barking, the band went on to release two compilation albums, 1992–2012 The Anthology and A Collection (the latter consists of radio edits and guest spots). They've also worked on a few projects with frequent collaborator director Danny Boyle, who the band had previously worked with, providing tracks for several of his films including Trainspotting, A Life Less Ordinary and The Beach, as well as writing the score with John Murphy on Boyle's 2007 film Sunshine. These projects were the soundtrack for Boyle's theatre production play Frankenstein and as musical directors for the 2012 Summer Olympics opening ceremony in London. After these projects, Karl Hyde and Rick Smith spent a couple of years apart while they both worked on their own separate musical aspirations. Hyde released his debut solo album Edgeland in 2013 and released two collaborative albums with Brian Eno titled Someday World and High Life, both released in May and June 2014 respectively. Meanwhile, Smith would continue to work with Danny Boyle through providing the musical score for Boyle's 2013 film Trance and the score for Babylon, a British drama television series that aired on Channel 4 in 2014 for which Boyle co-created and directed the 90 minute pilot. In late 2014, the band announced plans to release remastered and expanded editions of all of their studio albums "in the next few years". An expanded edition of dubnobasswithmyheadman was released on 6 October 2014, and the group toured in support of the album. An expanded edition of Second Toughest in the Infants was released on 20 November 2015. Underworld announced their brand new studio album only four days after the re-release of Second Toughest.

Development
The span gap of six years between Underworld's last studio album Barking and Barbara Barbara is the longest wait between records in their music career. Karl Hyde has said of the album: "When I listen to this record what I’m proud of most is that Rick and I made a record without thinking about where it fits or if it sounds like Underworld." The album was co-produced by drum and bass producer High Contrast, who previously worked with the band on Barking.

Title and artwork
Rick Smith came up with the title of the album from his father. Rick's mother's name is Barbara; she told Rick's father that she was fearful of the future without him, and Rick's father replied "Barbara, Barbara, we face a shining future". The artwork was created by art design collective group Tomato.

Release
The album was released first in Japan on 16 March 2016 before being released worldwide two days later on 18 March.

Critical reception

Barbara Barbara, We Face a Shining Future received critical acclaim. At Metacritic, which assigns a normalised rating out of 100 to reviews from mainstream critics, the album received an average score of 81, based on 26 reviews, which indicates "universal acclaim". It was Underworld's most critically acclaimed album on the site since 1999's Beaucoup Fish. Critics praised the production values and Karl Hyde's vocal performance, calling it the band's best album in years, as well as viewing it as their creative rebirth in the band's late musical career period. David Jeffries from AllMusic awarded the album 4 stars out of 5, describing the album as "Near perfect and a step forward as well" and proclaimed that "Barbara Barbara, We Face a Shining Future belongs on Underworld's top shelf."

Accolades

Commercial performance
Barbara Barbara, We Face a Shining Future debuted at number 10 on the UK Albums Chart, with first-week sales of 7,017 copies. This makes it Underworld's third album to reach the top 10 in the chart and their first UK top ten album since Beaucoup Fish in 1999. Barbara Barbara... also charted on several other UK charts including the Dance Albums Chart (No. 2), Download Albums Chart (No. 6), UK Physical Albums Chart (No. 10), UK Record Store Albums Chart (No. 3), UK Sales Albums Chart (No. 7) and UK Vinyl Albums Chart (No. 4). 

It also made the Billboard 200, debuting at number 200. It's the band's seventh album to achieve this.

Track listing

Charts

Year-end charts

Release history

References

2016 albums
Underworld (band) albums
Caroline Records albums